Morgan John Rhys, also Rhees (8 December 1760 – 7 December 1804) was a Welsh radical evangelical Baptist minister. He preached the principles of the French Revolution, against slavery, and in favour of the reform of parliament.

Life
Morgan John Rhys was a Welsh radical evangelical Baptist minister. He preached the principles of the French Revolution, against slavery, and in favor of the reform of parliament

In 1794 he grew tired of the repression in Britain and emigrated to America where he established a Welsh colony, Cambria. He bought land in the Allegheny Mountains of Pennsylvania from Dr. Benjamin Rush and founded the town of Beula, which to his dismay, never became a fully realized endeavor and died promptly within a decade of its founding (1796–1804). Despite the town's short lifespan, while it was in full bloom in the early years, Rhys established his own religious denomination and a newspaper, The Western Sky. After emigrating to America he changed his surname to Rhees. He vied desperately to the state and even federal government that there be a county in Pennsylvania called Cambria, and that his town of Beula ought to be the county seat. When in 1804 the Pennsylvania state government carved out Cambria County, Beula lost the vote to become its seat by one, instead, the nearby town of Ebensburg – originally part of Beula – became the county seat. Rhys died two weeks after the verdict was released.

He moved to Somerset County in 1799 and died there in 1804.

Descendants 
Morgan Rhees' second son, via his wife Anne Loxley (a daughter of Benjamin Loxley), Benjamin Rush Rhees (1798 –1831) was named after Morgan's friend and benefactor Benjamin Rush. He would become a prominent physician and one of the founders and first faculty members of Jefferson Medical College.

He was also the great-grandfather of (Benjamin) Rush Rhees (1860–1939), the third president of the University of Rochester and, in turn, great-great-grandfather of Wittgensteinian philosopher Rush Rhees. Morgan Rhees was also the great-grandfather of Nicholas Murray Butler, President of Columbia University.

References

Further reading
 V. Gagermeier, Joseph, A Civilized Mountain: The Story of Ebensburg (2021)
J. Evans, Morgan John Rhys a'i Amserau (1935)
 Gwyn Alf Williams, The Search for Beulah Land (1980)
 E. Wyn James,' "Seren Wib Olau": Gweledigaeth a Chenhadaeth Morgan John Rhys (1760–1804)', Trafodion Cymdeithas Hanes y Bedyddwyr (2007), pp. 5–37. ISSN 1462-9429
 E. Wyn James, 'Morgan John Rhys a Chaethwasiaeth Americanaidd', in Canu Caeth: Y Cymry a'r Affro-Americaniaid, ed. Daniel G. Williams (Llandysul: Gwasg Gomer, 2010), 2–25. .
 E. Wyn James, 'Welsh Ballads and American Slavery', The Welsh Journal of Religious History, 2 (2007), pp. 59–86. ISSN 0967-3938.

External links

Morgan J. Rhees papers, 1794-1968 at Columbia University
http://www.cardiff.ac.uk/special-collections/subject-guides/welsh-ballads/slavery

1760 births
1804 deaths
18th-century Baptist ministers from the United States
18th-century Welsh Baptist ministers
People from Caerphilly
Religious leaders from Pennsylvania
Welsh emigrants to the United States